DZTV-TV (channel 13) is a television station in Metro Manila, Philippines, serving as the flagship of the Intercontinental Broadcasting Corporation. The station maintains studios at the IBC Compound, Lot 3-B, Capitol Hills Drive cor. Zuzuarregui Street, Brgy. Matandang Balara, Diliman, Quezon City; Its hybrid analog and digital transmitting facility is located at 125 St. Peter Street, Nuestra Señora Dela Paz Subdivision, Santa Cruz, Antipolo, Rizal; sharing facilities with radio station DWLA 105.9 FM.

Digital television

Digital channels

DZTV-TV's digital signal operates on UHF channel 17 (491.143 MHz) and broadcasts on the following subchannels:

NTC released implementing rules and regulations on the re-allocation of the UHF Channels 14-20 (470–512 Megahertz (MHz) band) for digital terrestrial television broadcasting (DTTB) service. All operating and duly authorized Mega Manila VHF (very high frequency) television networks are entitled to a channel assignment from Channels 14 to 20.
On March 18, 2022, IBC began to transmit its digital test broadcast on UHF Channel 17 (491.143 MHz) as its permanent frequency assigned by NTC.

Areas of coverage

Primary areas 
 Metro Manila 
 Cavite
 Bulacan
 Laguna
 Rizal

Secondary areas 
 Portion of Pampanga
 Portion of Batangas
 Portion of Quezon
 Portion of Nueva Ecija
 Portion of Tarlac
 Portion of Zambales
 Portion of Bataan

See also
 Intercontinental Broadcasting Corporation
 List of Intercontinental Broadcasting Corporation channels and stations

References

Television stations in Metro Manila
Intercontinental Broadcasting Corporation stations
Television channels and stations established in 1960
Digital television stations in the Philippines